Freezer Burn may refer to:

Freezer burn, damage to frozen food caused by dehydration and oxidation
Freezer Burn (film), a 2007 independent film
Freezer Burn (novel), a 1999 crime novel by Joe R. Lansdale
Freezerburns, a frozen food review web show hosted by Gregory Ng
The working title of the film Captain America: The Winter Soldier

See also 
List of regional Burning Man events, listing several events called Freezer Burn